Al-Mu'jam al-Kabir, is one of the Hadith books compiled by Al-Tabarani (d.971). It is part of his Hadith book series by name of Mu'ajim Al-Tabarani. The other two books of the series are Al-Mu'jam al-Awsat & Al-Mu'jam as-Saghir.

Description
It is one of the larger hadith collections, containing almost sixteen thousand (16000) hadiths according to Maktaba Shamila.

Publications
The book has been published in various languages by many organizations around the world: 
  Mujam al Kabir (11 vol) المعجم الكبير, Published:  DKI, Beirut, 2007
     Mu‘jam al-kabīr (11 v.) by Ṭabarānī, Sulaymān ibn Aḥmad , Published: Bayrūt : Dār Iḥyā’ al-Turāth al-‘Arabī lil-Ṭibā‘ah wa-al-Nashr wa-al-Tawzī‘, 2009.
     Al-Mujam Al-Kabeer Arabic - Urdu (12 Volumes Full Set), Published: Non, Darussalam

See also
 List of Sunni books
 Kutub al-Sittah
 Sahih Muslim
 Jami al-Tirmidhi
 Sunan Abu Dawood
 Jami' at-Tirmidhi
 Either: Sunan ibn Majah, Muwatta Malik

References

9th-century Arabic books
10th-century Arabic books
Sunni literature
Hadith
Hadith collections
Sunni hadith collections